Alexander Koshetz (12 September 1875 – 21 September 1944) was an Ukrainian choral conductor, arranger, composer, ethnographer, writer, musicologist, and lecturer.  He helped popularize Ukrainian music around the world. His name is sometimes transliterated as Oleksandr Koshyts.

At one time, a performance of Koshetz's Ukrainian National Chorus held the world record for audience attendance, excluding sporting events. His performance also popularized Mykola Leontovych's "Shchedryk" in his concert, which Peter Wilhousky later translated into the popular "Carol of the Bells".

Biography

Early life and career 
Koshetz was born in the village of Romashky in Kiev Governorate, Russian Empire. He graduated from the Kiev Theological Academy in 1901, then studied in the Lysenko School of Music and Drama, 1908–1910.  He taught choral music at Kiev's Imperial Conservatory of Music, conducted the Sadovsky Theatre Orchestra, served as conductor and choirmaster of the Kiev Opera.

He also collected Ukrainian folk songs from central Ukrainian areas (notably around Kiev itself) as well as from the modern Russian area of Kuban, where he specially set out to see whether musical traditions of the Dnieper Cossacks are still present in their descendants, the Kuban Cossacks, who resettled there following the dissolution of the Zaporozhian Sich. In the latter case, he too managed to collect a number of songs.

From 1911 the directorate of the Imperial Music School invited him to lead a choral singing class at the school and later at the conservatory. In 1912, Mykola Sadovsky invited Oleksandr Koshyts to be the conductor of his theater, where he staged operas by Mykola Lysenko, Denis Sichynsky, Pietro Mascagni, and others. The Tale of the Old Mill” by Spiridon Cherkasenko and others.

From 1916 to 1917 he was choirmaster and conductor of the Kyiv Opera.

Ukrainian Republic Capella and emigration 

After World War I, Koshetz was the co-founder and conductor of the Ukrainian Republic Capella (later renamed Ukrainian National Chorus).  The choir toured Europe and the Americas in 1919–1924 and 1926–27, in support of the international Ukrainian community.

In 1917 Koshetz married a former student and singer in his choirs Tetyana Koshetz (1892–1966) who was later to become a vocalist in the Ukrainian National Chorus, voice teacher, and after 1944 curator of the Ukrainian Cultural and Educational Centre in Winnipeg.

It was Koshetz who introduced the song "Shchedryk" by Mykola Leontovych, at a concert in Kiev in 1919. Eventually the song became a Christmas classic under the name "Carol of the Bells".

He moved to New York City in 1922 where he collected liturgical music, arranged and popularized Ukrainian folk music.  Koshetz also documented the choir's travels in the memoir With Song, Around the World (З піснею через світ).

From 1941 Koshetz spent the summer months teaching in Winnipeg, Manitoba, Canada, where he died in 1944 at age 69.

Commemoration 
The O. Koshetz Choir in Winnipeg is named in his memory.

A unique concert titled the Unknown Koshetz was produced at the University of Manitoba on 26 March 2006.  The concert featured the Olexander Koshetz Choir of Winnipeg performing Koshetz "choral orchestrations" of music of Hawaii, Scotland, Afro-Americana, and First Nations, sung in both English and Ukrainian translations.

On his 130th birthday, a commemorative concert was held in Uspenskyi Cathedral of Kyiv Pechersk Lavra by the best graduates of the Tchaikovsky National Music Academy under patronage of President Yuschenko and under blessing of Ukrainian Orthodox Church.

The personal archives of Alexander and Tetyana Koshetz remain at the Ukrainian Cultural and Educational Centre in Winnipeg, Manitoba, Canada.

Music 
Although Koshetz was mostly known as a conductor, he also did his share of composing and arranging music. In the 1920s, after the creation of the Ukrainian Autocephalous Orthodox Church, Koshetz composed his liturgy, the Divine Liturgy of St. John Chrysostom, as well as ten Ukrainian religious chants. Later in emigration, he composed much more religious music.

Notes

References 
Koshetz, Oleksander (1952–1974) З піснею через світ: подорож української республиканської капелі (Z pisneiu cherez svit: podorozh ukrains’koi respublikans’koi kapeli), 3 volumes. Winnipeg, Культура і освіта (Kul’tura i osvita).

External links

 O. Koshetz Choir
 O. Koshetz – information and his works performed by the best Ukrainian choirs

1875 births
1944 deaths
19th-century classical composers
19th-century conductors (music)
20th-century classical composers
20th-century conductors (music)
20th-century male musicians
Kiev Theological Academy alumni
Male classical composers
Ukrainian classical composers
Ukrainian conductors (music)
Male conductors (music)
Ukrainian ethnographers
Ukrainian music educators
Ukrainian musicologists